Brescia or da Brescia is a surname derived from the city of Brescia in Italy. Notable people with the surname include:

Alfonso Brescia (1930–2001), film director
Domenico Brescia (1866–1939), composer
Fortunato Brescia Tassano (d. 1951), Italian-born Peruvian businessman
Giovanni Antonio da Brescia, painter
Giovanni Maria da Brescia, painter
Jason Michael Brescia (born 1986), comedy writer-director
Justin Brescia (born 1982), actor
Leonardo Brescia (1520–1582), painter
Lisa Brescia (born 1970), actress
Mario Brescia Cafferata (1929–2013), Peruvian billionaire businessman
Pedro Brescia Cafferata (1921–2014), Peruvian businessman
Rosa Brescia Cafferata (born c. 1926), Peruvian billionaire heiress and philanthropist

Italian-language surnames